The mass media in Senegal is varied and includes multiple television channels, numerous private radio stations, and over 15 newspapers.

Print media

Newspapers 

The reading public for Senegal's diverse press is largely limited to Dakar and Thies.  The quasi-official Le Soleil is a daily newspaper.  Other major popular independent newspapers include the dailies Sud Quotidien, WalFadjri, Le Quotidien, Le Matin, Le Populaire, Il Est Midi, and the economic weekly Nouvel Horizon. National newspapers are in French. English-language newspapers such as the International Herald Tribune are also available at many newsstands. 
 
Various trade organizations publish bulletins and newsletters such as those of the Dakar Chamber of Commerce and the periodical Entreprendre issued by the National Council of Business Leaders.

Magazines 
Several Europe-based magazines enjoy a wide circulation, including Jeune Afrique, L'Autre Afrique, Paris Match, L'Express, Le Point, as well as the European editions of Time, Newsweek and The Economist.

See also
 List of radio stations in Senegal
 List of radio stations in Africa
Radiodiffusion Télévision Sénégalaise, the Senegalese public broadcasting company
Telecommunications in Senegal
Internet censorship and surveillance in Senegal
 Cinema of Senegal

References

Bibliography
  (About Senegal)

External links
 

 
Senegal
Senegal